Bo Peder Jesper Mattsson (born 18 April 1968) is a Swedish former professional footballer who played as a centre-back.

Club career

Sweden
Mattsson was born at Visby. He started his career for his hometown club Visby IF Gute before joining Gefle IF in 1991. In 1994, Mattsson moved to Allsvenskan club BK Häcken, leaving in the end of the 1994 season after the club was relegated.

He then signed for Halmstads BK in 1995, where he became a regular first team member and won the 1994–95 Svenska Cupen, scoring in the final match, and the 1997 Allsvenskan. Mattsson also played in the 3–0 win against Parma in the 1995–96 UEFA Cup Winners' Cup. and left the club after the 1998 Allsvenskan having missed only 3 league matches for the club.

England
Mattsson went on a trial for Norwich City, scoring in a 6–0 win for the reserve team against Luton Town, but was not signed. He then joined Premier League side Nottingham Forest in December for a £300,000 fee. He played a total of six league matches for Forest, including the infamous 8–1 defeat to Manchester United. He suffered a knee injury in 1999 and subsequently retired.

Amateur football
After retirement, he played amateur football for IS Örnia.

International career
Mattsson played once for the Sweden national football team in a 1–1 draw against Iceland for the UEFA Euro 1996 qualifying.

Honours
Halmstad
Allsvenskan: 1997
Svenska Cupen: 1994–95

References

External links

Jesper Mattsson at playmakerstats.com (English version of ogol.com.br)

Living people
1968 births
Association football central defenders
Expatriate footballers in England
Swedish footballers
Sweden international footballers
Swedish expatriate footballers
Premier League players
BK Häcken players
Halmstads BK players
Nottingham Forest F.C. players
Sportspeople from Gotland County